This is a list of musicians and musical groups utilizing some form of overtone singing.

Traditional

These are musicians using a traditional method of overtone singing:
Overtone singing originates among the people in the Urankhai region of Siberia, who have historic links to Mongols (although they might speak Turkic languages, like Tuvans).

Turkic and Mongols
Bukhchuluun Ganburged
Kaigal-ool Khovalyg of Huun-Huur-Tu
Kongar-ool Ondar featured in Genghis Blues and work with Bela Fleck & The Flecktones
Okna Tsahan Zam from Kalmykia
Igor Koshkendey from Chirgilchin
Mongun-Ool Ondar from Chirgilchin
Hosoo
Albert Kuvezin of Yat-Kha (formerly Huun-Huur-Tu)
Saidash Mongush
Enkhjargal Dandarvaanchig, also known as Epi
Sainkho Namtchylak

Groups
Alash Ensemble
Altai Khairkhan from Mongolia
Chirgilchin
Huun-Huur-Tu
Tuvan National Orchestra
Tyva Kyzy
Yat-Kha
The Hu

Others
Paul Pena from San Francisco featured on Genghis Blues
Nils-Aslak Valkeapää Yoik singer from Finland
Fátima Miranda
Soriah

Non-traditional
Michael Vetter
 Avi Kaplan Bass singer and vocal percussionist in Pentatonix
Anna-Maria Hefele
Guy Mendilow composer, show-creator, uses western overtone singing in multimedia productions like The Forgotten Kingdom
 Theo Bleckmann - featured in composer John Hollenbeck's composition The Music of Life
 Arrington de Dionyso of Old Time Relijun
 Diamanda Galás - Greek-American performance artist and renowned vocalist; when performing an opera by Vinko Globokar she had to produce four tones at once 
 Ilaria Orefice Italian (Sardinia) singer and vocal researcher published on Pubmed and The Journal Of Voice, vocalist in the Nordic Folk band Nebala 
 Luca Atzori Italian singer and actor. 
 Demetrio Stratos - Italian singer of Greek and Egyptian origin, explored overtone singing, diplophony, triplophony with Area (band) and in his solo records, in particular Cantare la voce
 Tran Quang Hai - Vietnamese overtone singer, researcher on Mongolian khoomei in France in 1969

References

 Enrique Ugalde alias Soriah

Throat singing
Lists of musicians